Candido Cannavò (29 November 1930 – 22 February 2009) was an Italian journalist, well known as the historical editor (1983–2002) of the Italian sport newspaper La Gazzetta dello Sport.

Biography 

Cannavò was born in Catania and begun to work as sport journalist for La Sicilia when he was nineteen. He was president of CUS Catania from 1952 until 1955, when he was hired by La Gazzetta dello Sport. In 1981, he became vice-director and, in 1983, director. During his stay, the Gazzetta consolidated as the major Italian sport newspaper; Cannavò also launched the weekly Sportweek and the Gazzetta website.

Cannavò gained national popularity also for his numerous TV appearances in connection with the Giro d'Italia and Serie A football. He continued to write for Gazzetta until two days before his death; he was also author of an autobiography and of essays about social themes, such as Italian prisons, as well as handicapped and homeless people.

He died of cerebral hemorrhage in Milan in 2009, aged 78, and is buried at the city's Monumental Cemetery.

Works
Una vita in rosa (2002) 
Libertà dietro le sbarre (2004) 
E li chiamano disabili (2005) 
Pretacci. Storie di uomini che portano il Vangelo sul marciapiede (2008)

Gallery

Sources
Obituary at Gazzetta website 

1930 births
2009 deaths
Italian sports journalists
Journalists from Catania
Burials at the Cimitero Monumentale di Milano
Italian newspaper editors
Italian male journalists